The COVID-19 pandemic in Guadeloupe is part of the ongoing global viral pandemic of coronavirus disease 2019 (COVID-19), which was confirmed to have spread to the French overseas department and region of Guadeloupe on 12 March 2020.

Background 
On 12 January 2020, the World Health Organization (WHO) confirmed that a novel coronavirus was the cause of a respiratory illness in a cluster of people in Wuhan City, Hubei Province, China, which was reported to the WHO on 31 December 2019.

The case fatality ratio for COVID-19 has been much lower than SARS of 2003, but the transmission has been significantly greater, with a significant total death toll.

Timeline

On 12 March, the first case of COVID-19 in Guadeloupe was confirmed.

As of 16 March, there had been 6 positive cases and no deaths. By 26 March, there had been 84 positive cases and 1 death.

On 21 August, Valérie Denux, director of the Regional Health Agency of Guadeloupe (ARS), announced the archipelago alert threshold was crossed, with an incidence rate of 86.23, per 100,000 inhabitants; doubling in the previous week. A scheduled meeting was scheduled to take place on 25 August, to announce monitoring activity by the COVID-19 committee as well as plans by local authorities on educational institution reopening plans.

Preventive measures 
 As of 13 August, face masks must be worn in all indoor spaces for people over the age of 11, but the rule has not been extended to outdoor public spaces.
 Recommendation that large gatherings be avoided, Unauthorized events are subject to fines of €135.

See also
 COVID-19 pandemic
 COVID-19 pandemic by country and territory
 COVID-19 pandemic in South America

References

External links
 Reports on the Guadeloupe Prefecture website

COVID-19 pandemic
Guadeloupe
Guadeloupe
Disease outbreaks in Guadeloupe